Nd-doped YCOB (Nd:YCa4O(BO3)3) is a nonlinear optical crystal, which is commonly used as an active laser medium. It can be grown from a melt by the Czochralski technique. It belongs to the monoclinic system with space group Cs2-Cm. Each neodymium ion replaces a yttrium ion in the YCOB crystal structure.

Parameters in the Sellmeier equation

Further reading

Nonlinear optical materials
Electro-optical materials
Anisotropic optical materials
Self-frequency-doubling materials
Crystals
Laser gain media
Neodymium compounds
Yttrium compounds
Calcium compounds
Boron compounds